Massanutton Heights is a historic home located near Luray, Page County, Virginia. It was built about 1820, and is a large two-story, four bay, Federal style brick dwelling with a side gable roof.  It has two exterior end chimneys and one interior chimney.  The house has a three-room, single pile plan with closed winder stairs in the southwest corners of the two end rooms. A large, two-story frame addition and full width front porch were constructed in 1924 when the building was used as a boarding house.  The interior features painted decorations in the first floor parlor.

It was listed on the National Register of Historic Places in 1976.

References

Houses on the National Register of Historic Places in Virginia
Federal architecture in Virginia
Houses completed in 1820
Houses in Page County, Virginia
National Register of Historic Places in Page County, Virginia